Robert Smolańczuk (born in Olecko, Poland) is a Polish theoretical physicist.

He received his doctorate from the Soltan Institute for Nuclear Studies in 1996. He later visited Lawrence Berkeley National Laboratory (LBNL) as a Fulbright Fellow between 1998-2000.

He predicted in late 1998 that a lead-and-krypton collision technique could produce the element oganesson, at that time considered impossible by most scientists involved in heavy-element research. This was experimentally attempted at LBNL in 1999 and appeared to have been successful, but an investigation determined that the data had been fabricated by Victor Ninov. It is now expected that this reaction is unlikely to succeed. Smolańczuk received the Nitchke Award in 2000 for developing a phenomenological model of synthesis of superheavy nuclei. He currently works at the National Centre for Nuclear Research in Otwock, Poland.

References

Polish nuclear physicists
21st-century Polish physicists
Living people
Year of birth missing (living people)